better known by his ring name , is a Japanese professional wrestler currently working as a freelancer and is best known for his time in the Japanese promotion DDT Pro-Wrestling.

Professional wrestling career

Early career
Yoshida made his professional wrestling debut at SPWF Fierce Fighting First Team WINNER'S, an event promoted by Social Pro Wrestling Federation on November 25, 1994, where he teamed up with Devil Hopper to defeat Dangerous Uchida and another unknown opponent. He made an appearance in Big Japan Pro Wrestling at a house show promoted on December 29, 1995, where he fell short to Yosuke Kobayashi.

Dramatic Dream Dream / DDT Pro-Wrestling (1997–present)
Yoshida's fame came from his tenure with DDT Pro-Wrestling. At DDT Document DDT on January 16, 2001, he competed in a 25-man battle royal also involving Gentaro, Mikami, Shark Tsuchiya, Nosawa Rongai, Tanomusaku Toba and others.

Yoshida is known to have competed in various of the promotion's signature events such as DDT Judgement. He made his first appearance at the very first event under the branch, Judgement 1 where he teamed up with Hiroshi Shimada and Judeisuto to defeat Mitsuo Maeda, Kaminari and Miracle Power. At Judgement 3 on March 20, 1999, he teamed up with Kamen Shooter Super Rider in a losing effort to Super Uchuu Power, Phantom Funakoshi and Tsunehito Naito as a result of a six-man tag team match. At Judgement 4 on March 30, 2000, he teamed up with Mitsunobu Kikuzawa and Sanshiro Takagi to pick up a victory over Masao Orihara, Poison Sawada Black and Masahiko Orihara. At Judgement 5 on March 28, 2001, Yoshida defeated Sanshiro Takagi to win the KO-D Openweight Championship. At Judgement 8 on March 20, 2004, he teamed up with Sanshiro Takagi and Kamen Shooter Super Rider to defeat Shoichi Ichimiya, Mr. Blue, Gargantua, Iron Chef, Shigeo Kato, Chotaro Kamoi, Fuchichu Crow, Nagase Kancho, Naoshi Sano and Uchuu Power A in a 10-on-3 Handicap Captain's Fall Elimination match. At DDT 10th Anniversary: Judgement 2007 on March 11, he won a 5 Minute + α Minute Limitless Battle Royal for the Ironman Heavymetalweight Championship also involving Fushicho Karasu, Kikutaro, Naoshi Sano, Taneichi Kacho and Yuki Miyazaki.

Championships and accomplishments
Dramatic Dream Team / DDT Pro-Wrestling
Ironman Heavymetalweight Championship (2 times)
KO-D Openweight Championship (1 time)
DDT Trios Tournament (1999) – with Takashi Sasaki and Sanshiro Takagi

References 

1964 births
Living people
Japanese male professional wrestlers
People from Tokyo
20th-century professional wrestlers
Ironman Heavymetalweight Champions
21st-century professional wrestlers
KO-D Openweight Champions